In Croatia, the Opposition comprises all political parties represented in the Croatian Parliament that are not part of the Government which is supported by the parliamentary majority.

The Leader of the Opposition is the unofficial title held by the leader of the largest party with no representatives within the government. Where one party wins outright this is usually the leader of the second largest political party in the Parliament (usually the Croatian Democratic Union (HDZ) or the Social Democratic Party (SDP)).

The current Leader of the Opposition is Davorko Vidović, president of the Social Democrats, who took up the role on 9 July 2022, upon the party's official establishment.

6th assembly of Sabor

In the Sixth assembly of the Croatian Parliament (2007–2011), the parties in Sabor that included the opposition were:
 Social Democratic Party
 Croatian People's Party – Liberal Democrats
 Istrian Democratic Assembly
 Croatian Democratic Assembly of Slavonia and Baranja
 Croatian Party of Pensioners
 Croatian Party of Rights
 Croatian Labourists – Labour Party

The leader of the opposition was Zoran Milanović, leader of the Social Democratic Party of Croatia.

7th assembly of Sabor

In the Seventh assembly of the Croatian Parliament (2011–2015), the parties in Sabor that include the opposition were:
 Croatian Democratic Union
 Croatian Labourists – Labour Party
 Croatian Democratic Assembly of Slavonia and Baranja
 Independent list of Ivan Grubišić
 Croatian Citizen Party
 Croatian Party of Rights dr. Ante Starčević
 Croatian Peasant Party
 Democratic Centre

8th assembly of Sabor

In the Eight assembly of the Croatian Parliament (2015–2016), the parties in Sabor that include the opposition are:
 Social Democratic Party 
 Croatian People's Party – Liberal Democrats 
 Croatian Labourists – Labour Party
 Istrian Democratic Assembly 
 Croatian Party of Pensioners 
 Croatian Democratic Alliance of Slavonia and Baranja 
 People's Party - Reformists 
 Human Blockade

9th assembly of Sabor

In the Ninth assembly of the Croatian Parliament (2016–2020), the parties in Sabor that include the opposition are:

 Social Democratic Party 
 Istrian Democratic Assembly 
 Human Blockade
 Croatian Party of Pensioners
 Croatian Democratic Alliance of Slavonia and Baranja
 Bridge of Independent Lists

The leader of the opposition from 14 October 2016 until 26 November 2016 was Zoran Milanović and since 26 November 2016 it has been Davor Bernardić, the leader of the Social Democratic Party.

10th assembly of Sabor

In the Tenth assembly of the Croatian Parliament (2020–), the parties in Sabor that include the opposition are:

 Social Democratic Party 
 Istrian Democratic Assembly 
 The Bridge
 Homeland Movement
 We can!
 Croatian Sovereignists
 Social Democrats (since 9 July 2022)

The acting leader of the opposition from 6 July 2020 until 3 October 2020 was Zlatko Komadina, and from 3 October 2020 until 9 July 2022 it had been Peđa Grbin, the leader of the Social Democratic Party. A new party called the Social Democrats was founded on 9 July 2022, and it immediately became the largest opposition party in parliament. Its leader, Davorko Vidović, thus took up the role of leader of the opposition.

List of leaders of the Opposition since the first multi-party election
 (3)
 (1)
 (3)

Leaders of the Opposition by time in office

1. Dražen Budiša        7 years, 167 days
2. Zoran Milanović      5 years, 148 days
3. Ivica Račan          4 years, 157 days
4. Tomislav Karamarko   3 years, 246 days
5. Ivo Sanader          3 years, 237 days
6. Davor Bernardić      3 years, 223 days
7. Peđa Grbin 1 year, 279 days
8. Jadranka Kosor       150 days
9. Vladimir Šeks (Acting) 93 days
10. Zlatko Komadina (Acting) 89 days
11. Željka Antunović (Acting) 52 days
12. Davorko Vidović

References

See also
Politics of Croatia

Political opposition
Politics of Croatia
Croatia